The 2002 Women's Hockey World Cup Qualifying Playoff was an international hockey competition contested by India and the United States. The tournament was held in Cannock from 22 to 25 June 2002.

The United States won the tournament, with one win and two draws, qualifying for the 2002 FIH World Cup.

History
In September 2001, the United States had qualified to compete in the Intercontinental Cup in Abbeville and Amiens. Following the September 11 attacks however, the team were forced to withdraw due to the disruption of airline schedules. Subsequently, the FIH announced that the seventh placed team at the Intercontinental Cup would face the United States in a qualifying playoff.

India qualified for the playoff series as seventh placed team at the Intercontinental Cup, following Lithuania's withdrawal.

Teams

Head coach:

Head coach:

Results

Pool

Fixtures

Statistics

Final standings

Goalscorers

References

External links
Official website
International Hockey Federation

International women's field hockey competitions hosted by England
2002 Women's Hockey World Cup
2002 in English sport
June 2002 sports events in Europe